The John B. Hynes Veterans Memorial Convention Center is a convention center located in Boston, Massachusetts. It was built in 1988 from a design by architects Kallmann, McKinnell & Wood. It replaced the John B. Hynes Memorial Auditorium, also a convention center, built in 1963 during the Massachusetts Turnpike expansion from Route 128 to the Central Artery, which was regarded as "ungainly". The 1988 design "attempted to relate in scale and materials to its Back Bay setting, adopting granite and setbacks. The severe gray interior is reminiscent of an early 20th-century German railroad station".  The Center is named after former Boston mayor John Hynes.

Function as meeting space

Physical characteristics
The building has  of exhibit space and can accommodate up to four concurrent events. It features  of meeting space with 38 permanent rooms and a  grand ballroom.

Notable past events

 Anime Boston occupies the Hynes annually with approximately 25,000 attendees each year.
 Berklee College of Music Berklee High School Jazz Festival 
 CollegeFest
 First Night Boston
 Harvard Model Congress
 Harvard Model United Nations
iGEM Giant Jamboree

Location 
The convention center is connected to the nearby Prudential Center complex.

Transportation 
The convention center is connected by aerial passageways to a nearby hotel complex and can be reached by public transportation via the Hynes Convention Center station on the MBTA Green Line and, using the passageways, via the Back Bay station on the Orange Line, Commuter Rail, and Amtrak.  Logan Express shuttles run directly to and from Logan International Airport.

Nearby hotels 
 Colonnade Hotel Boston is connected underground via the Prudential Center T Stop and Prudential Mall.
 Copley Square Hotel
 Newbury Guest House
 Mandarin Oriental, Boston
 Hilton Back Bay
 Sheraton Boston is directly connected to the convention center.
 Marriott Copley Place is connected to the convention center via the Copley Place Mall.
 Westin Copley Place is connected to the convention center via the Copley Place Mall.

Closure and redevelopment 
On September 16, 2019, Governor Charlie Baker announced his plans to close and sell the Hynes to finance an expansion at the Boston Convention and Exhibition Center.

Gallery

References

Further reading 
 Patterson, Gregory A. "New Hynes Convention Center to open today". The Boston Globe, January 21, 1988.  p. 25.
 Gold, Allan R. "Amid debate, Boston's convention center opens. (John B. Hynes Veterans Memorial Convention Center)". The New York Times 137. January 23, 1988.
 Goldberger, Paul. "Architecture view; How to Take the Curse Off Convention Centers". The New York Times. February 26, 1989.
 Campbell, Robert. "A second look at Boylston's new buildings". The Boston Globe. September 12, 1989. p. 63.
 Howe, Peter J. "Lawmaker urges veto for Hynes Center subsidy". The Boston Globe. July 1, 1991.
 Leigh, Scot. "Hynes chief says criticism from Malone harms center". The Boston Globe. July 12, 1991.
 Biddle, Frederic M. and Scot Lehigh. "Senate panel backs Hynes aid but limits effort to ease removal of convention center director". The Boston Globe. October 30, 1991.  p. 27.
 Van Voorhis, Scott. Finneran says Hynes center could be sold. Boston Herald. April 20, 2002. p. 18.
 Palmer, Thomas C. Jr. "For sale: Hynes Convention Center? Board mulls future of Back Bay facility". The Boston Globe. June 25, 2002. p. D1.
 Van Voorhis, Scott. "Hynes center review affecting bookings; Bankers group doesn't commit to 2007 date". Boston Herald. June 29, 2002. p. 16.
 Editorial; "Goodbye to Joyce and Hynes Center". Boston Herald. January 17, 2003. p. 22.
 Thomas C. Palmer Jr. "Tentative tourists: prospect of Hynes Center's closing cuts into bookings". The Boston Globe. November 26, 2003. p. D.1.
 Governing Greater Boston: Meeting the Needs of the Region's People. Rappaport Institute for Greater Boston, John F. Kennedy School of Government, Harvard University, 2003.
 "Boston's Hynes Convention Center, Garage Seen Worth Only $99 Million". The Boston Globe. April 13, 2004.
 Neuwahl, Janette. "Business leaders urge state to keep Hynes Center open; they cite revenue generated in area". The Boston Globe. April 2, 2005. p. B5.
 Howe, Peter J. "Despite cross-town rival, Hynes rallies". The Boston Globe. August 23, 2005.
 Sanders, Heywood. Space Available: The Realities of Convention Centers as Economic Development Strategy. Brookings Institution Research Brief, January 1, 2005. 
 Chesto, Jon. All signs point to a long life for the Hynes center. The Patriot Ledger. Quincy, Mass.: January 21, 2006. p. 29.
 Howe, Peter J. "Commission will urge state to keep Hynes convention center". The Boston Globe. December 19, 2006.
 ArchBoston.org. "Evolution of the Prudential Center: 1954–1989". Discussion thread beginning March 7, 2007.
 ArchBoston.org. "Hynes renovation". Discussion thread beginning April 20, 2007.
 Mohl, Bruce. "Hynes set to get $18m renovation. (John B. Hynes Veterans Memorial Convention Center)". The Boston Globe. April 21, 2007.
 Darrow, Bryan. "Hynes Center to upgrade: older convention facility gets new lease on life in Boston. (News Line)". Meetings & Conventions 42.7 (June 2007): 18(1).
 Abelson, Jenn. "Hynes Center signs deal with local restaurateurs". The Boston Globe. April 4, 2009. p. B5.

External links 

 Kallmann, McKinnell & Wood
 Massachusetts Convention Center Authority, owner of the Hynes Center

1988 establishments in Massachusetts
Back Bay, Boston
Event venues in Boston
Commercial buildings completed in 1988
Convention centers in Massachusetts
Economy of Boston
Event venues established in 1988